Caoilfhionn Ní Bheacháin, Irish academic

Biography
Doctor Ní Bheacháin is a faulty member and lecturer in Communications at Kemmy Business School, University of Limerick. She studied at Trinity College Dublin and NUI Galway. Her research has covered cultural history of the Irish Free State, media and business communication, marketing and ethics.

External links
 https://www.ul.ie/business/kbs-staff/dr-caoilfhionn-n%C3%AD%C2%AD-bheach%C3%A1in
 http://miseeireconference.ie/speakers/caoilfhionn-ni-bhachain/
 https://limerick.academia.edu/CaoilfhionnN%C3%ADBheach%C3%A1in

21st-century Irish people
21st-century Irish women
Irish-language writers
Academics of the University of Limerick